The South Gawler Football Club is a country Australian rules football club, founded by James Fitzgerald in the Gawler South area of the Barossa Valley town of Gawler, South Australia, in 1889. The Lions, who wear royal blue and white stripes, currently compete in the Barossa Light & Gawler Football Association. Their club and oval today situated at Eldred Riggs Reserve, Evanston, in Gawler.

The Lions have produced some champion footballers, many who have played senior football in the South Australian National Football League (SANFL) and the Australian Football League (AFL) as well as representing South Australia. Sam Butler became South Gawler's first fully professional footballer with the AFL's West Coast Eagles in 2004 and a member of the Eagles' 2006 Premiership team. Defender Yves Sibenaler Jr played in seven SANFL Premierships (2003, 2004, 2005, 2007, 2008, 2009, 2010) for Central District, while Alan Obst (a 2007 Premiership player also with the Bulldogs) was listed with AFL clubs Adelaide and North Melbourne. During the twentieth century, WW "Winky" Price (a triple premiership player with West Adelaide), Lawrie Rusby (who played 172 league games for South Adelaide including premierships in 1935 and 1941) and Irishman Robin Mulholland (112 games for Central District) also represented South Australia in State-of-Origin during celebrated careers in the SANFL. While Stephen Officer played for South Melbourne in the Victorian Football League between 1971 and 1975.

According to a number of forums covering country Australian Rules football, South Gawler is possibly one of the most successful football clubs in Australia. Following the 2021 BLGFA title, with 38 first-grade premierships recorded and verified, discussion since 2008 suggests that the Lions have accumulated the third-most premierships in South Australia and are the equal-sixth winningest Australian Rules club in Australia.

While success at senior level had initially eluded them in the new century, South Gawler remained buoyant with their junior development programs continuing to consistently produce success. The club's Junior Colts won the flag in 2012 and 2015, while the Senior Colts' completed a hat-trick of premierships from 2009 to 2011, again in 2013 and most recently were crowned back-to-back premiers again in 2019 and 2020.

In 2021 the Lions finally broke their longest senior premiership drought (since 1993) in the club's 133-year history. After 28 years (an interim during which they finished runners up in 1996, 2014 and 2020) South came back from a 57 point deficit halfway through the second quarter to overturn arch-rivals Willaston by one goal in the 2021 Grand Final at Elliott Goodger Park. The Lions at last would claim their fourth BLGFA title and 38th senior premiership. It is one of the greatest comeback victories in SA country football Grand Final history, and quite likely the greatest turnaround in any BLGFA final ever. 2021 was further punctuated by the club winning the first ever inaugural BLGFA Under 13s premiership for a new junior grade, while the Reserves were gallant runners-up.

Season 2022 saw both the A Grade and Reserves make the Grand Final once again, however with a reversal of fortunes. While the second senior team were crowned Premiers; their first title since 2012, the A Grade who had dominated all season to be favourites were upset by Nuriootpa.

Premierships
Gawler Football Association

1891,
1893,
1894,
1899,
1901,
1902,
1906,
1907,
1909,
1910,
1911,
1920,
1921,
1922,
1923,
1924,
1925,
1927,
1929,
1931,
1932,
1934,
1952

Gawler and District Football League

1954,
1955,
1960

Adelaide Plains Football League
1961

Gawler and District Football League

1963,
1967,
1969,
1970,
1974,
1979,
1986

Barossa, Light and Gawler Football Association

1990,
1992,
1993,
2021

Life Members

1891 – J. Fitzgerald, T.H. Willett
1934 – A. Sweeney, C.A. Rau, E. Higgins
1947 – E. Mahoney, H. Freeman, G. Mahoney, R. Byrne
1953 – P. Giles, F. Hutchins
1954 – W.T. Causby
1958 – A.C. Nottle, G.E. Nottle
1960 – S.N. Edmonds, H.J. Smith
1961 – H.C. Adams, R.B. Gordon, R.F. Martin
1965 – R.J. Argent, G.S. Shannon, B. Nottle, G. Newberry, R.J. Shannon, J.A. Gleeson
1966 – R. Symes, J.W. Nottle
1968 – M.V. Heinrich, K.M. Jones, C. Freak Jnr, D.H. Freak
1969 – D.A. Clark, T. Stockton, T.E. Gleeson, R.J. Riggs, R.J. Charnstrom, B.P. O'Donoghue
1970 – B. Long
1971 – D.S. Rolton, Mrs D.R. McDonald, Mrs C.J. Clark
1972 – Mrs M. Mahoney, B. Deuter, I. McDonald, J.L.P. O'Reilly
1973 – E. Officer
1975 – P.J.W. Gevers, W.W. Isgar
1978 – R.E. Officer, G. Hurst
1979 – E.P. Alwood
1980 – A.H. Russell, J.T. Symes
1982 – Mrs D.J. Symes
1985 – A.P. Jenkins, G.P. Short
1986 – L.G. Clark
1989 – M.K. O'Reilly, K.P. O'Reilly
1992 – X. Sibenaler
1993 – R.J. Hutchins
1998 – C. Bloffwitch, Z. Okunieff
2003 – Mrs L. Officer, P. Montgomerie, Ms M. Wohlstadt
2004 – R.J. O'Donoghue
2005 – J.F. Daly, D.C. Ellis
2009 – R. Ahrens
2010 – P. Bain
2012 – K. Bevis
2014 – K. Barker, G. Barker
2015 – Mrs. J. Hewett
2016 – G. Davies
2018 – D. Barker, C. Hurst
2019 – G. Schultz, D. Cash

State of Origin Footballers
Peter Swift – South Adelaide, South Australia

Cecil Adcock – South Adelaide, South Australia

Charlie Waters – South Adelaide, South Australia

E.H. Cockram – South Adelaide, South Australia
	
"Winky" Price – West Adelaide, South Australia

Lawrie Rusby – South Adelaide, South Australia

Robin Mulholland – Central District, South Australia

VFL / AFL League Footballers
Stephen Officer – South Melbourne

Sam Butler – Central District, West Coast, East Perth, Perth

Alan Obst – Central District, Adelaide, North Melbourne

SANFL League Footballers

Jimmy Fitzgerald – Gawler

George Sanderson – Gawler

Fred May – South Adelaide

Toby Arthur – South Adelaide

Sid Coles – North Adelaide

Doug Thomson – Sturt

Tom Doherty – South Adelaide	 

Tom Woods – North Adelaide	 

Fred Rusby – North Adelaide

Eddie Henwood – South Adelaide
	
G.A. Titus – Norwood
	Wally Ayling – North Adelaide 
	Perce Crump – South Adelaide, Norwood
	Howard Abbott – Port Adelaide
	Ron May – North Adelaide
	Arthur Lamb – North Adelaide 	 
	Jim Wainwright – North Adelaide	 
	Bruce Causby – Sturt 	 
	John Nottle – Sturt
	Bob Edmonds – Central District
	Yves Sibenaler – Central District
	Anton Noack – Central District
	Kym Harrison – Woodville
	Chris Hurst – Central District
	Gary Sutton – Central District
	Aaron Bevis – Central District
	Kane Officer – Central District
	Yves M. Sibenaler – Central District
	Brodie Hudson – Central District
	Heath Lawry – Central District
	Paul Marschall – Central District, Adelaide
	Marcus Barreau – Central District
	Jordan Tippins – Central District

Expatriate SANFL / WAFL League Footballers

Dick Shirley – West Torrens
	Barry Walker – West Torrens
	Kevin Webber – Central District
	Alf Skuse – South Adelaide
	Mick Daly – Central District
	Lyndon Fairclough – Central District
	Ken Russell – Central District
	Bing Munn – West Adelaide
	Clayton Pethick – North Adelaide
	Darryl Moss – Glenelg
	James Fuller – South Adelaide / Woodville
	Graham Schultz – South Adelaide / Central District
	Peter Beythien – Central District
	Steven Riley – Central District
	Brendan Little – North Adelaide / Central District
	David Bubner – Central District
	Peter Hart – North Adelaide
	Malcolm McGrath – Central District
	Tano Barilla – Central District
	Joe Trimboli – Central District
	Garth Newton – Woodville
	Ian Dettman – Woodville
	Lindsay Nicholls  – North Adelaide / Norwood
	Steven Hann – North Adelaide / Port Adelaide
	Gavin Chaplin – West Perth / Central District
	Scott Norton – Central District
	Robert Fraser – Central District
	Nick Prokopec – Central District / West Adelaide
	Aaron Bayliss – West Adelaide
	Matt Lutze – West Adelaide
  Chris Musolino – Central District
  Chad O'Sullivan – Central District / North Adelaide
  Jackson Press – Woodville-West Torrens
  Dean Cutting – Central District
  Jack Osborn – Adelaide / Sturt
  Domenic Costanzo – Adelaide
  Josh Wittwer – Adelaide

South Australia State Country Footballers
1986 – Brett Riggs  	 
1994 – Eddie Schwerdt 	 
1995 – Eddie Schwerdt
2022 – Steve Burton
2022 – Patrick White

South Australia State Under-age Footballers
1951 – Brenton Nottle  	 
1985 – Brett Riggs 	 
1989 – Darren Joyce
1997 – Aaron Bevis
2003 – Sam Butler
2005 – Alan Obst

Association Best and Fairest
Gawler Football Association
	1912 Mail Medal – Winky Price
	1923 P.J. Broderick Medal – H. Bentley / A.R. May
	1927 P.J. Broderick Medal – P. Baldwin
	1936 Mail Medal – Eddie Mahoney
	1937 Mail Medal – Eddie Mahoney
	1938 Mail Medal – Eddie Mahoney
	1941 W. Wiles Trophy – M. Williams
	1947 Page Trophy – Bob Gordon
	1948 Page Trophy – Bob Gordon
Gawler and District Football League
	1954 Mail Trophy – Stan Edmonds
	1957 Mail Trophy – John Nottle
	1963 Mail Trophy – Dean Clark
	1970 Mail Trophy – Xavier Sibenaler
	1975 Mail Trophy – Mick Daly
	1976 Mail Trophy – Kym Stoddard
	1983 Bunyip Medal – Graham Schultz
Barossa, Light and Gawler Football Association
1989 Linke and Mail Medals – Eddie Schwerdt
1992 Linke and Mail Medals – Eddie Schwerdt
1995 Linke and Mail Medals – Eddie Schwerdt
2002 Linke and Mail Medals – Ben Halliday
2022 Schluter Medal – Steve Burton

References
Heinrich, David and Hurst, Garry. The history of the South Gawler Football Club 1889–1989, [Gawler, S. Aust. : The South Gawler Football Club], c1990
Laidlaw, Robert. The History of the Gawler and District Football League. Bunyip Press. 2008
Lines, Peter. Encyclopedia of South Australian Country Football Clubs. 2008
Laidlaw, Robert. The Central District Football Club 30 Year Almanac

External links
 

Australian rules football clubs in South Australia
1889 establishments in Australia
Australian rules football clubs established in 1889